Jeremy Daniel Quastel ,  is a Canadian mathematician specializing in probability theory, stochastic processes, partial differential equations. He is currently head of the mathematics department at the University of Toronto. He grew up in Vancouver, British Columbia, and now lives in Toronto, Ontario.

Career
Quastel earned his PhD at Courant Institute of Mathematical Sciences at New York University in 1990; the advisory was S. R. Srinivasa Varadhan. He was a postdoctoral student at the Mathematical Sciences Research Institute in Berkeley, then a faculty member at University of California, Davis for the next six years; returned to Canada in 1998.

Research
Jeremy Quastel is recognized as one of the top probabilists in the world in the fields of hydrodynamic theory, stochastic partial differential equations, and integrable probability. In particular, his research is on the large scale behaviour of interacting particle systems and stochastic partial differential equations.

Awards, distinctions, and recognitions
Fellow of the Royal Society (2021)
CMS Jeffery–Williams Prize (2019)
CRM-Fields-PIMS prize (2018)
Royal Society of Canada Fellow (2016)
Killam Research Fellowship (2013) for his research of stochastic processes and partial differential equations used to describe natural processes of change and evolution
invited speaker at the Current Developments in Mathematics (2011)
invited speaker at the International Congress of Mathematicians in Hyderabad (2010)
Sloan Fellow (1996–98)

Family
Jeremy Quastel is the grandson of biochemist Juda Hirsch Quastel.

Sources

External links

1963 births
Living people
Academic staff of the University of Toronto
Probability theorists
PDE theorists
Scientists from Toronto
Scientists from Vancouver
20th-century Canadian mathematicians
21st-century Canadian mathematicians